D'Mani Lucell Bughail-Mellor (born 20 September 2000) is an English professional footballer who plays for EFL League Two club Rochdale, on loan from Wycombe Wanderers.

A Manchester United player from the age of eight, Mellor made his first-team debut in a UEFA Europa League match in November 2019. He spent time on loan at Salford City during the 2021–22 season. In July 2022, Mellor signed for Wycombe Wanderers after being released by United.

Club career
Mellor joined Manchester United at the age of eight. He made his senior debut in a Europa League match against Astana on 28 November 2019. In August 2020, Mellor revealed he had suffered a serious knee injury, which resulted in him being unable to play at all in the 2020–21 season.

In August 2021, he moved to League Two club Salford City on loan. In January 2022, Mellor was recalled early from Salford after making three substitute appearances in an injury-hit spell. Later that month, United were criticised by Crawley Town manager John Yems, who claimed that a loan deal for Mellor collapsed before the transfer deadline because of paperwork issues. In May 2022, he announced that he would be leaving United upon the expiry of his contract in the summer. On 4 July 2022, Mellor signed for Wycombe Wanderers.

On 27 January 2023, Mellor joined League Two club Rochdale on loan until the end of the season.

Career statistics

References

External links

2000 births
Living people
Black British sportspeople
English footballers
Footballers from Manchester
Association football forwards
Manchester United F.C. players
Salford City F.C. players
Wycombe Wanderers F.C. players
Rochdale A.F.C. players
English Football League players